George Lindsay Stewart (11 December 1882 – 10 November 1962) was a Scottish professional footballer, who played for Hibernian, Manchester City, Partick Thistle and the Scottish national team.

Club career
An outside right, Stewart began his professional career with Hibernian in 1904, replacing John Stewart (no relation) who had been part of the squad that won the Scottish Football League in 1903.

After two good years in Leith, Stewart was transferred to Manchester City at the end of the 1905–06 season for £650, which was a substantial transfer fee (the record fee at the time, for the transfer of Alf Common, was £1000). He made over 100 league appearances for City, experiencing a relegation in 1909 followed by promotion as winners of the 1909–10 Football League Second Division, before ending his career with short spells at Partick Thistle, Stalybridge Celtic and Merthyr Town, settling in the Manchester area.

International career
While playing for Hibs at club level Stewart made his Scotland debut in a 2–0 defeat by Wales at Tynecastle in the 1906 British Home Championship, and then also played in the 2–1 victory against England in the same tournament. He won two further international caps during his time with Manchester City.

References

External links 

Stewart's first international cap, Hibernian Historical Trust

Hibernian F.C. players
Manchester City F.C. players
Partick Thistle F.C. players
Scotland international footballers
Scottish footballers
Scottish Football League players
English Football League players
1882 births
1962 deaths
Association football outside forwards
Scottish Football League representative players
Strathclyde F.C. players
Wishaw Thistle F.C. players
Stalybridge Celtic F.C. players
Scottish Junior Football Association players
Southern Football League players
Merthyr Town F.C. players
Sportspeople from Wishaw
Footballers from North Lanarkshire